Malaa is a French electronic music DJ and producer, who is signed to Tchami's label Confession. He broke onto the electronic music scene through his single "Notorious", which was the second release on Confession. His identity is unknown as he appears in public as a balaclava-wearing man. His participation in the Pardon My French collective suggests he is French, as all other members are.

Identity
Malaa's identity is unknown. It is strongly suggested that Malaa consists of a duo with DJs DJ Snake and Tchami, as they are credited often on each other's track productions and are connected to the project via remixes. It is also speculated that French DJ Mercer is involved in Malaa, since the same management team is shared between the three artists.  Through a Reddit post made on the topic, Redditors discovered a tweet on Twitter where a user wrote "cant believe im opening for dj snake + tchami's side project next thursday", while linking to a SoundCloud mix by Malaa. The tweet was then favourited by DJ Snake's Twitter account, which hints his participation on the topic. French DJ Sebastien Benett is also speculated to be Malaa, due to the quick removal of a Facebook comment from Mercer's profile which stated that Malaa was a nickname of Benett and that the last posts by Benett on SoundCloud coincide with the first appearances of Malaa. Both have also been seen individually smoking cigarettes frequently. Benett was also part of the group of 5 dj's called 'Reepublic' before joining the Malaa project.

Career

2015–present 
In September 2017, Malaa and French future house artist Tchami announced their "No Redemption" tour which was held in North America. To promote the tour event, they released a hip-hop influenced house track titled "Summer 99" on 29 September 2017.

Malaa is known for his "Who Is Malaa?" continuous mixes which he releases through SoundCloud, which feature ghetto house and future house tracks.

Pardon My French 

Malaa is currently part of the Pardon My French team, a collective of four French DJs composed of DJ Snake, Mercer, Tchami and himself. Throughout the year 2016 and early 2017, the collective went on a Pardon My French Tour in North America.

Discography

Compilation albums

Extended plays

Singles

Remixes

References

Future house musicians
Masked musicians